Cvjetićanin is a Serbian surname, a toponymic derived from several placenames, such as Veliki Cvjetnić. It may refer to:

Danko Cvjetićanin (born 1963), retired Yugoslav basketballer
Emanuel Cvjetićanin (1833–1919), Austro-Hungarian commander
Milan M. Cvjetićanin (d. 1963), Serbian Chetnik.
Tatjana Cvjetićanin, Serbian archaeologist, President of Rei Cretariae Romanae Fautores, President of the Steering Board of the Balkan Museum Network and former director of the National Museum of Serbia

References

Serbian surnames
Croatian surnames